Route nationale 8a (RN 8a) is a secondary highway of 118 km in Madagascar, running from Maintirano to Antsalova. It crosses the region of Melaky.

Selected locations on route
(north to south)
Maintirano  - (intersection with RN 1a )
Antsalova (118 km)

See also
List of roads in Madagascar
Transport in Madagascar

References

Roads in Madagascar
Roads in Melaky